In Your House 9: International Incident was the ninth In Your House professional wrestling pay-per-view (PPV) event produced by the World Wrestling Federation (WWF, now WWE). The event took place on July 21, 1996, at General Motors Place in Vancouver, British Columbia, Canada. Six matches were held at the event, including one taped for Free for All.

The main event of the show was a six-man tag team match between the trio referred to as The People's Posse (WWF World Heavyweight Champion Shawn Michaels, Sycho Sid, and WWF Intercontinental Champion Ahmed Johnson) against "Camp Cornette" (Vader, Owen Hart, and The British Bulldog). With the launch of the WWE Network in 2014, this show became available on demand, except for the Free for All match.

Production

Background
In Your House was a series of monthly pay-per-view (PPV) shows first produced by the World Wrestling Federation (WWF, now WWE) in May 1995. They aired when the promotion was not holding one of its then-five major PPVs (WrestleMania, King of the Ring, SummerSlam, Survivor Series, and Royal Rumble), and were sold at a lower cost. In Your House 9: International Incident took place on July 21, 1996, at General Motors Place in Vancouver, British Columbia, Canada. The name of the show was based on the event being held in Canada.

Storylines
In Your House 9: International Incident featured professional wrestling matches involving different wrestlers from pre-existing scripted feuds, plots, and storylines that were played out on Monday Night Raw and other World Wrestling Federation's (WWF) television programs. Wrestlers portrayed a heel (wrestling term for guys who portray the "bad guys") or a face (short for "babyface," meaning the "Good guy")  as they followed a series of events that built tension, and culminated into a wrestling match or series of matches.

The show was originally supposed to have The Ultimate Warrior team up with Shawn Michaels and Ahmed Johnson against the heel trio of Vader, Owen Hart, and The British Bulldog but in the weeks prior to the show the Ultimate Warrior and the WWF had a disagreement (resulting in Warrior no-showing several house shows) and the Warrior left the company. The WWF brought Sycho Sid back after several months absence, turning his character face as he saved Michaels and Johnson from a three-on-two attack during an episode of Monday Night Raw. Leading up to the show manager Jim Cornette bragged that he was so sure of his team being victorious that he would give everyone who bought the Pay Per View their money back if they lost.

Event
Mankind was originally scheduled to face Jake Roberts in the second match of the PPV but Roberts had to be replaced with Henry O. Godwinn on the night of the show. During the match commentator Jerry Lawler made several jokes at Jake Roberts' expense, stating that Roberts had fallen off the wagon, began drinking etc. referencing Roberts' troubled past that he had freely talked about after returning to the WWF. The commentary was meant to build tension between Roberts and Lawler for a future match, not a comment of Roberts' sobriety at the time. During a subsequent bout between The Undertaker and Goldust, Mankind revealed that he had not gone to the back after his win over Henry Godwinn, but instead climbed under the ring while the arena was dark. During the match he emerged through the floor of the ring, grabbed the Undertaker by the foot and then dragged him down under the ring with him. This led to a disqualification victory for the Undertaker after the interference. Later on, as Mankind was back in the ring, the Undertaker emerged through another hole in the floor and attacked Mankind. The two brawled all the way to the back of the arena, into the building's boiler room. The main event saw the Camp Cornette team victorious as Vader pinned Shawn Michaels following interference from Jim Cornette himself.

Aftermath
Shawn Michaels successfully defended the WWF World Heavyweight Championship against Vader in the main event of the 1996 SummerSlam event just one month later. At the same event Mankind defeated the Undertaker in a Boiler Room Brawl when the Undertaker's manager Paul Bearer sided with Mankind.

Results

Other on-screen personnel

See also

Professional wrestling in Canada

References

09: International Incident
1996 in British Columbia
Events in Vancouver
Professional wrestling in British Columbia
1996 WWF pay-per-view events
July 1996 events in Canada
WWE in Canada